The Team is a 2015 European crime drama television series that first premiered on 22 February 2015 on DR in Denmark. The series follows a number of national police agencies, working through the framework of Europol, to attempt to solve a series of cross-border murders. Among others, the team is primarily headed by Danish homicide detective Harald Bjørn (Lars Mikkelsen), Belgian homicide detective Alicia Verbeek (Veerle Baetens), and German Federal Criminal Police superintendent Jackie Müller (Jasmin Gerat). A second season premiered in 2018 with a different cast.

Cast

First Series 

 Lars Mikkelsen as Harald Bjørn, chief of the Danish police team
 Jasmin Gerat as Jackie Müller, chief of the German police team
 Veerle Baetens as Alicia Verbeeck, chief of the Belgian police team
 Nicholas Ofczarek as Marius Loukauskis
 Carlos Leal as Jean-Louis Poquelin
 Ida Engvoll as Kit Ekdal, assistant to Harald Bjørn
 Koen De Bouw as Frank Aers, assistant to Alicia Verbeeck
 Miriam Stein as Natascha Stark, assistant to Jackie Müller
 Hilde Van Mieghem as Stéphane Pernel, superior to Alicia Verbeeck
 Alexandra Rapaport as Liv Eriksen, wife of Harald Bjørn
 Filip Peeters as Bruno Koopmann
 Marc Benjamin as Max Ritter, German undercover agent
 Jella Haase as Bianca Loukauskis
 Andreas Pietschmann as Elias Müller, husband of Jackie Müller
 Ole Boisen as Finn Moesgaard, assistant to Harald Bjørn
 Nadeshda Brennicke as Dahlia Loukauskis
 Lisbeth Wulff as Else Hojby, assistant to Harald Bjørn
 Sunnyi Melles as Iris Gabler André Hennicke as Rainer Stark Line Pillet as Fifi VerbeekBelgian guest stars include Marijke Pinoy, Line Pillet, Gilda De Bal, Bert Haelvoet, Kim Hertogs, Begir Memeti, Kadèr Gürbüz, Manou Kersting and Joy Anna Thielemans.

 Second Series 

As sorted alphabetically:
 Marie Bach Hansen as Nelly Winther Lynn Van Royen as Paula Liekens Jürgen Vogel as Gregor Veiss''

Music
The opening theme is a cut of the song "Northern Rd." from the album "Little Heavy Burdens" by Belgian indie rock band Intergalactic Lovers.

External links 
  (English language version from ZDF)

References

Danish crime television series
2015 in Danish television